The 2022 season was Sabah's seventh competitive season in the highest tier of Malaysian football since the foundation of Malaysia Super League in 2004. It is also the third season for Sabah to play in Malaysia Super League after winning the 2019 Malaysia Premier League which got promoted.

Players

First-team squad

Friendly matches

Pre-Season Friendlies

SMJ Cup

Indonesia Tour

Competitions

Overview

Malaysia Super League

League table

Results summary

Results by round

Fixtures and Results

FA Cup

Fixtures and Results

Malaysia Cup

Fixtures and Results

Statistics

Squad statistics
{| class="wikitable" style="text-align:center" width=90%
|-
!rowspan=2 |
!rowspan=2 |
!rowspan=2 width="200"| Player
!colspan=6 width="150" | Super League
!colspan=6 width="105" | FA Cup
!colspan=6 width="105" | Malaysia Cup
!colspan=6 width="150" | Total
|-
!
!
!Goals
!
!
!
!
!
!Goals
!
!
!
!
!
!Goals
!
!
!
!
!
!Goals
!
!
!
|-
|1||GK
|align="left"| Ramzi Mustakim  
|| || || || || ||   || || || || || ||    || || || || || ||    || || || || || || 
|-
|2||DF
|align="left"| Abdul Hanafie Tokyo
||6||3|| || || ||   ||1|| || || || ||    ||4|| || ||2|| ||    ||11||3|| ||2|| || 
|-
|3||DF
|align="left"| Rawilson Batuil
||19||13|| ||2|| ||1    ||3||3|| ||2|| ||    ||5||5|| ||2|| ||    ||27||21|| ||6|| ||1
|-
|4||DF
|align="left"| Jackson de Souza
||16||16||2||2|| ||    ||1||1|| || || ||    || || || || || ||    ||17||17||2||2|| || 
|-
|5||DF
|align="left"| Gerald Gadit 
||5||1|| || || ||    ||1|| || || || ||    ||2||2|| ||2||1||    ||8||3|| ||2||1|| 
|-
|6||DF
|align="left"| Park Tae-Soo
||19||19||8||6|| ||    ||3||3|| ||1|| ||    ||3||3|| || || ||    ||25||25||8||7|| || 
|-
|7||MF
|align="left"| Baddrol Bakhtiar
||20||19||6||1|| ||    ||2||2|| || || ||    ||5||5||2|| || ||    ||27||26||8||1|| || 
|-
|8||MF
|align="left"| Tommy Mawat Bada
||10||8|| ||2|| ||    ||1|| || ||1|| ||    || || || || || ||    ||11||8|| ||3|| || 
|-
|9||FW
|align="left"| Farhan Roslan
||11||3||1||1|| ||    ||1|| || || || ||    ||6||6||1||1|| ||    ||18||9||2||2|| || 
|-
|10||FW
|align="left"| Taiki Kagayama
||22||21||2|| || ||    ||2||2||1|| || ||    ||6||6||2|| || ||    ||30||29||5|| || || 
|-
|11||MF
|align="left"| Alto Linus
||8||8|| ||1|| ||    ||1||1|| || || ||    ||1||1|| ||1|| ||    ||10||10|| ||2|| || 
|-
|12||FW
|align="left"| Thanabalan Nadarajah
||3||2|| ||1|| ||    ||1||1|| || || ||    ||2|| || || || ||    ||6||3|| ||1 || || 
|-
|13||DF
|align="left"| Badrul Afendy Fadzli
||2|| || || || ||    ||1||1|| || || ||    ||4||2|| ||1|| ||    ||7||3|| ||1|| || 
|-
|15||DF
|align="left"| Rizal Ghazali
||18||17|| ||5||1||    ||1||1|| || || ||    ||5||5|| ||1|| ||    ||24||23|| ||6||1|| 
|-
|17||FW
|align="left"| Amri Yahyah
||18||6||5||3|| ||    ||3||3|| || || ||    ||6||1|| ||1|| ||    ||27||10||5||4|| || 
|-
|19||GK
|align="left"| Khairul Fahmi Che Mat
||22||22|| ||1|| ||    || || || || || ||    || || || || || ||    ||22||22|| ||1|| || 
|-
|20||MF
|align="left"| Gary Steven Robbat
||15||11|| ||4|| ||    ||2||1|| || || ||    || || || || || ||    ||17||12|| ||4|| || 
|-
|21||DF
|align="left"| Nazirul Naim
||15||8|| || || ||    ||3||1||1|| || ||    ||3||3|| || || ||    ||21||12||1|| || || 
|-
|22||MF
|align="left"| Stuart Wilkin
||18||14||2||1|| ||    ||3||3|| || || ||    ||4||4|| || || ||    ||25||21||2||1|| || 
|-
|27||FW
|align="left"| Dirga Surdi
|| || || || || ||    || || || || || ||    ||1|| || || || ||    ||1|| || || || || 
|-
|29||MF
|align="left"| Ummareng Bacok
||8||2|| ||1|| ||    ||1||1||1||1|| ||    ||3|| || || || ||    ||12||3||1||2|| || 
|-
|31||GK
|align="left"| Damien Lim 
||2|| || || || ||    ||3||3|| || || ||    ||6||6|| || || ||    ||11||9|| || || || 
|-
|33||DF
|align="left"| Dominic Tan 
||21||19||2||1|| ||    ||2||2|| || || ||    ||6||6|| ||1|| ||    ||29||27||2||2|| || 
|-
|67||FW
|align="left"| Saddil Ramdani 
||17||17||4||2|| ||    ||3||1||1||1|| ||    ||3||2|| || || ||    ||23||20||5||3|| || 
|-
|69||FW
|align="left"| Sahrizan Saidin
||2|| || || || ||    ||1||1|| || || ||    ||1||1|| || || ||    ||4||2|| || || || 
|-
|70||FW
|align="left"| José Embaló
||7||6||1||1|| ||    ||1|| || || || ||    || || || || || ||    ||8||6||1||1|| || 
|-
|77||MF
|align="left"| Irfan Fazail
||14||2||1||1|| ||    ||2||1|| || || ||    ||4||4|| ||2|| ||    ||20||7||1||3|| || 
|-
|80||FW
|align="left"| Azhad Harraz
||11|| || ||1|| ||    ||1|| || || || ||    ||5||3|| || || ||    ||17||3|| ||1|| || 
|-
|88||FW
|align="left"| Maxsius Musa
||3|| || || || ||    ||1||1|| || || ||    ||5||1||1|| || ||    ||9||2||1|| || || 
|-
|9||FW
|align="left"| Neto Pessoa
||6||5||2|| || ||    ||1|| || || || ||    || || || || || ||    ||7||5||2|| || || 
|-
|-
|! colspan=5 style="background: #efefef; text-align: center;" | TOTALS
! 3
! 3
! 1
! 1
|! colspan=2 style="background: #efefef; text-align: center;" |
! 4
! 6
! 0
! 0
|! colspan=2 style="background: #efefef; text-align: center;" |
! 6
! 14
! 1
! 0
|! colspan=2 style="background: #efefef; text-align: center;" |
! 46
! 57
! 2
! 1
|-

Goals

Clean sheets

References 

Sabah F.C. (Malaysia) seasons
Sabah